Carl Haase (26 January 1920 – 7 January 1990) was a German historian and director of the Hanover State Archives. He was a specialist in the history of the medieval town and the history of Hanover in the 18th to the 19th centuries. It was his idea, in 1968, to create the German Historical Institute London.

References

Further reading 
 Dieter Brosius: Carl Haase 1920–1990. In: Niedersächsisches Jahrbuch für Landesgeschichte 62 (1990), S. 491–494. (online)
 Klaus Friedland: Carl Haase 1920–1990. In: Hansische Geschichtsblätter 108 (1990), S. V–VI.
 Otto Merker: Carl Haase †, geb. Hamburg 26. Januar 1920, gest. Hannover 7. Januar 1990. In: Der Archivar. Mitteilungsblatt für deutsches Archivwesen. 44. Jg. 1991, Sp. 339–346. (Digitalisat)

1920 births
1990 deaths
German archivists
20th-century German historians
German Historical Institute London